Lionel Berry Joyner (28 March 1932 – 28 June 2001) was a Canadian chess player, Canadian Chess Championship winner (1961), Canadian Open Chess Championship medalist (1964).

Chess career
From the late 1950s to the mid-1960s, Lionel Joyner was one of Canada's leading chess players. In 1951, he represented Canada in the first World Junior Chess Championship. In 1956 Lionel Joyner became the chess champion of Montreal, having won all 17 games in the tournament. He was  first in 1961, +8 =2 -1, and second in 1965, +8 =2 -1, in Canadian Chess Championship. Also Lionel Joyner won bronze medal in Canadian Open Chess Championship in 1964. In 1985, in Vancouver he shared 1st place in the Paul Keres Memorial Tournament.

Lionel Joyner played for Canada in the Chess Olympiad:
 In 1958, at first reserve board in the 13th Chess Olympiad in Munich (+4, =6, -3).
 
Also Lionel Joyner played correspondence chess and won the Correspondence Chess Tournament Golden Knights Postal (1961–1962).

After leaving Montreal, he lived in the Alberta province and later in the British Columbia province. Lionel Joyner worked at the Vancouver Stock Exchange.  He was an active member of the Port Coquitlam Chess Club in his final years.

References

External links

Lionel Joyner chess games at 365Chess.com

1932 births
2001 deaths
Canadian chess players
Chess Olympiad competitors
20th-century chess players